Jenny Hanley (born 15 August 1947) is an English actress. She remains best known for being one of the presenters of the ITV children's magazine programme Magpie.

Early life and education 
Hanley is the daughter of actors Dinah Sheridan and Jimmy Hanley. After her education at schools in Southern England and in Switzerland, she trained as a nanny and did modelling work. Through her mother she is of Russian-Jewish and German descent.

Personal life and family
Hanley's grandmother was a photographer who, as Studio Lisa, had privileged access to the royal family, photographing both Princess Elizabeth and Princess Margaret in relaxed, family poses and the next generation, Prince Charles, Princess Anne and Prince Edward in informal shots. She also helped to launch the career of a male model who later became an actor, Roger Moore.

Her brother, Sir Jeremy Hanley, had a career as an accountant and later became a Conservative Party MP.

Hanley married Herbie Clark in 1980, and they had two sons before divorcing in 1997.

Television and film career 
Her film appearances include the James Bond film On Her Majesty's Secret Service (1969), The Private Life of Sherlock Holmes (1970), and the Hammer horror film Scars of Dracula (also 1970). She appeared in the 3D film The Flesh and Blood Show (1972).

She has also appeared on television as an actress in such series as Department S, The Persuaders!, The Adventurer, Softly, Softly: Taskforce,  Warship, Man About the House and Return of the Saint. Hanley appeared on Magpie from 1974 to 1980.

In 1980, Hanley stepped in to co-present one edition of Saturday Night at the Mill following the dismissal after just 5 shows of Arianna Huffington. This proved a success with viewers and she returned as co-host for the entire 1981 season. She has appeared in the dictionary corner of Countdown. She teamed up with Tony Blackburn to present a low-budget morning chat show on Sky Channel.

Radio career 
Hanley has had regular radio shows as a presenter, including on BBC Radio Berkshire,  Radio SAGA (on which she played music and interviewed guests) and, since February 2021, Boom Radio.

Filmography

References

External links

Jenny Hanley on Boom Radio

1947 births
Living people
English film actresses
English people of German descent
English people of Russian-Jewish descent
English television actresses
People from Gerrards Cross